Italy competed at the 1951 Mediterranean Games in Alexandria, Egypt.

Medals

Athletics

Medalists

Gold
Antonio Siddi — Athletics, 200 metres
Armando Filiput — Athletics, 400 metres hurdles
Pino Dordoni — Athletics, 10 km race walk
Mauro Frizzoni, Franco Leccese, Wolfango Montanari, Antonio Siddi — Athletics, 4 x 100 metres relay
Giuseppe Tosi — Athletics, Discus throw
Teseo Taddia — Athletics, Hammer throw
Antonio Balossi, Silvio Bergamini — Rowing, Double sculls
Luciano Marion, Giuseppe Ramani, Aldo Tarlao  — Rowing, Coxed pairs
Domenico Cambieri, Guido Cristinelli, Angelo Ghidini, Francesco Gotti, Reginaldo Polloni — Rowing, Coxed fours
Erio Bettega, Domenico Cambieri, Guido Cristinelli, Angelo Ghidini, Francesco Gotti, Reginaldo Polloni, Giuseppe Ramani, Aldo Tarlao — Rowing, Eights
Aristide Pozzali — Boxing, –51 kg
Bruno Visintin — Boxing, –63.5 kg
Renzo Ruggeri — Boxing, 67 kg
Gianbattista Alfonsetti — Boxing, –81 kg
Giacomo Di Segni — Boxing, +81 kg
Nicola Dioguardi, Mario Favia, Edoardo Mangiarotti, Alessandro Mirandoli, Antonio Spallino — Fencing, Team foil
Roberto Ferrari, Idalgo Masetto, Ilio Niccolini, Domenico Pace, Mauro Racca  — Fencing, Team sabre
Armando Dallantonio, Edoardo Mangiarotti, Dario Mangiarotti, Mario Mangiarotti, Carlo Pavesi — Fencing, Team épée
Guido Figone — Gymnastics, Horizontal bar
Guido Figone — Gymnastics, Parallel bars
Ignazio Fabra — Wrestling, Greco-Roman –52 kg
Antonio Randi — Wrestling, Greco-Roman –62 kg
Antonio Cerroni — Wrestling, Greco-Roman –79 kg
Umberto Silvestri — Wrestling, Greco-Roman –87 kg
Guido Fantoni — Wrestling, Greco-Roman, open category
Adolfo Manfredi — Shooting, Individual trap
Otello Marini, Edoardo Medi, Giuseppe Melini, Giulio Prati — Shooting, Team trap

References

External links
Mediterranean Games Athletic results at Gbrathletics.com

Nations at the 1951 Mediterranean Games
1951
Mediterranean Games